College (Lower Tanana: Trothyeddha') is a census-designated place (CDP) in Fairbanks North Star Borough, Alaska, United States. It is part of the Fairbanks, Alaska Metropolitan Statistical Area. As of the 2020 census, the population was 11,332, down from 12,964 in 2010. College is the third-most populated CDP in Alaska.

College is adjacent to the city of Fairbanks. The University of Alaska Fairbanks lies within its boundaries and serves as its core. The area is often referred to as part of Fairbanks, and not as a separate entity. The area is served by the University of Alaska Fairbanks for fire protection and ambulance service, and jointly by the University of Alaska Fairbanks Police Department and Alaska State Troopers for police protection.

Geography
College is located at  (64.848302, -147.827194).

Climate

According to the Köppen Climate Classification system, College has a subarctic climate, abbreviated "Dfc" on climate maps.

Demographics

College first appeared on the 1930 U.S. Census as an unincorporated village. It was made a census-designated place in 1980.

At the 2000 census, there were 11,402 people, 4,104 households and 2,638 families residing in the CDP. There were 4,501 housing units at an average density of 241.1/sq mi (93.1/km2). The racial makeup of the CDP was 77.9% White, 3.1% Black or African American, 9.0% Native American, 3.2% Asian, 0.1% Pacific Islander, 1.1% from other races, and 5.7% from two or more races. 3.5% of the population were Hispanic or Latino of any race.

There were 4,104 households, of which 37.1% had children under the age of 18 living with them, 48.0% were married couples living together, 11.0% had a female householder with no husband present, and 35.7% were non-families. 25.7% of all households were made up of individuals, and 3.2% had someone living alone who was 65 years of age or older. The average household size was 2.60 and the average family size was 3.13.

26.7% of the population were under the age of 18, 16.8% from 18 to 24, 29.1% from 25 to 44, 22.6% from 45 to 64, and 4.7% who were 65 years of age or older. The median age was 30 years. For every 100 females, there were 107.6 males. For every 100 females age 18 and over, there were 109.2 males.

The median household income was $56,560 and the median family income was $69,969. Males had a median income of $47,126 versus $31,495 for females. The per capita income for the CDP was $23,381. About 4.9% of families and 8.2% of the population were below the poverty line, including 8.2% of those under age 18 and 4.8% of those age 65 or over.

Education
The Fairbanks North Star Borough School District operates the public grade schools that serve the CDP. The oldest of these is University Park Elementary ("U-Park"), which opened in 1958 along University Avenue. A new school building for U-Park was constructed on Loftus Road during the 1990s; the original school is now used for classrooms by the UAF Community and Technical College. The district operates several other schools within CDP boundaries: along with U-Park, Pearl Creek Elementary, Woodriver Elementary and West Valley High serve attendance areas which include the CDP (middle school students attend Randy Smith Middle and Ryan Middle, located in Fairbanks city limits). Effie Kokrine Charter, Watershed Charter and Hutchison High are also located in the CDP. These schools have open enrollment and are not governed by attendance area boundaries.

The Yukon–Koyukuk School District, which operates public schools in a widely scattered swath of rural Interior Alaska covering much of the nearby Yukon-Koyukuk Census Area, has its headquarters within the CDP boundaries.

References

External links

  from the Alaska Film Archives — Bob Hamme (1931–1975) stars as "Granny" in an early 1970s commercial for a small business in College, which shows a period view of the area surrounding the College Road and Hess Avenue intersection.

Census-designated places in Alaska
Census-designated places in Fairbanks North Star Borough, Alaska